Seyyedi (Persian: صيدي‎‎) may refer to

Villages in Iran
Cham Seyyedi-ye Olya
Cham Seyyedi-ye Sofla
Cham Seyyedi-ye Vosta
Eshkali Seyyedi
Javad-e Seyyedi 
Kamarsheh Seyyedi Dallah 
Seyyedi Bazar
Seyd Beyg
Seyd Beyg 
Sufi Seyyedi

Other uses
Houman Seyyedi (born 1980), Iranian actor and filmmaker

See also
 Seyyed
 Seydi (disambiguation)